Weydahl or Veydahl is a surname. It may refer to:

Carl Weydahl or Carl Veidahl (1879–1974), Norwegian sport shooter
Hanna-Marie Weydahl (1922–2016), Norwegian pianist

See also
Wegdahl, Minnesota, an unincorporated community in Chippewa County, in the U.S. state of Minnesota